The 2020–21 season was Monaco's eighth consecutive season in Ligue 1 since promotion from Ligue 2 in 2013.

Season events
On 19 July, AS Monaco announced the departure of Robert Moreno as their manager, and later the same day announced the appointment of Niko Kovač as manager on a three-year contract.

Transfers

Summer
On 4 June, AS Monaco announced that they had agreed a deal for Kévin N'Doram to make his loan deal at FC Metz a permanent transfer.

On 25 June, Everton announced that they had agreed a deal with AS Monaco to extend the loan of Djibril Sidibé until the end of their season. On 29 June, AS Monaco confirmed this, along with Gil Dias' loan being extended until the end of the 2019–20 La Liga season.

On 26 June, AS Monaco announced that they had agreed a deal for Anthony Musaba to join from NEC Nijmegen on a five-year contract, with the deal to be concluded upon the opening of the international transfer window on 1 July 2020.

On 30 June, AS Monaco announced that Romain Faivre would be leaving the club to join Stade Brest.

On 1 July, AS Monaco confirmed that the loan deals for Pelé, Jordi Mboula and Antonio Barreca had all been extended until the end of their respective seasons.

On 8 July, Benjamin Henrichs moved to RB Leipzig on a season-long loan deal, with the option for RB Leipzig to make the move permanent.

On 7 August, AS Monaco announced the signing of Axel Disasi to a five-year contract from Reims.

On 10 August, AS Monaco signed their first professional contract with Jonathan Bakali.

On 11 August, AS Monaco announced that Kamil Glik would be leaving the club to join Benevento, with Nabil Alioui joining Le Havre the following day.

On 13 August, Francesco Antonucci left AS Monaco to sign for Feyenoord, whilst Lyle Foster made a permanent move to Vitória de Guimarães.

On 21 August, Julien Serrano joined Livingston on a season-long loan deal.

On 24 August, Anthony Musaba joined Cercle Brugge on a season-long loan deal.

On 26 August, Wilson Isidor joined Bastia-Borgo on a season-long loan deal, whilst Jonathan Panzo left the club to sign for Dijon.

On 27 August, AS Monaco announced the signing of Caio Henrique from Atlético Madrid to a five-year contract.

On 2 September, AS Monaco announced the signing of Kevin Volland from Bayer Leverkusen to a four-year contract.

On 8 September, Adrien Bongiovanni joined Den Bosch on a season-long loan deal.

On 10 September, Nacer Chadli Left AS Monaco to sign permanently with İstanbul Başakşehir. The following day, 11 September, AS Monaco announced the signing of Vito Mannone on a two-year contract after his Reading contract had expired at the end of the previous season, whilst Adama Traoré moved permanently to Hatayspor and Jean Marcelin joined Cercle Brugge on a season-long loan deal.

On 17 September, Jordi Mboula left AS Monaco to sign for Real Mallorca.

On 23 September, Loïc Badiashile was loaned to Las Rozas for the season, whilst Florentino Luís joined AS Monaco on a season-long loan deal on 25 September.

On 25 September, Gil Dias was loaned to Famalicão for the season, whilst on 29 September, Pelé returned to Rio Ave on a season-long loan and Jean-Eudes Aholou returned to RC Strasbourg on a similar deal. The following day Keita Baldé moved on loan to Sampdoria for the season.

On 1 October, Gabriel Pereira joined Lazio on a season long loan deal, with Jorge joining Basel on a similar deal the following day.

On 5 October, Yoann Etienne moved from AS Monaco to Lorient, Antonio Barreca joined Fiorentina on loan for the season, and Giulian Biancone extended is contract with AS Monaco until the summer of 2024 and joined Cercle Brugge on loan for the season. The next day, 6 October, Arthur Zagre moved to Dijon on loan for the season.

On 17 October, Russian forward Kirill Klimov moved to Rubin Kazan.

Winter
On 21 January, defender Strahinja Pavlović joined Cercle Brugge on loan for the remainder of the season, whilst the following day, 
 22 January, Monaco announced the signing of Krépin Diatta from Club Brugge on a five-year contract. On 25 January, Henry Onyekuru was loaned to Galatasaray for the remainder of the season.

Squad

Reserves

Transfers

In

Loans in

Out

 Transfers announced on the above date, became official when the transfer window opened on 1 July.

Loans out

Released

Trial

Friendlies

Competitions

Overview

Ligue 1

League table

Results summary

Results by matches

Results

Coupe de France

Statistics

Appearances and goals

|-
!colspan="14"|Players away from the club on loan:

|-
!colspan="14"|Players who left Monaco during the season:
|}

Goalscorers

Clean sheets

Disciplinary record

|-
|colspan="17"|Players away on loan:

|-
|colspan="17"|Players who left Monaco during the season:

References

AS Monaco FC seasons
AS Monaco
Monaco